Group L of the 2017 Africa Cup of Nations qualification tournament was one of the thirteen groups to decide the teams which qualified for the 2017 Africa Cup of Nations finals tournament. The group consisted of four teams: Guinea, Malawi, Zimbabwe, and Swaziland.

The teams played against each other home-and-away in a round-robin format, between June 2015 and September 2016.

Zimbabwe, the group winners, qualified for the 2017 Africa Cup of Nations.

Standings

Matches

Goalscorers
3 goals

 Khama Billiat
 Knowledge Musona

2 goals

 Idrissa Sylla
 Chiukepo Msowoya
 Gerald Phiri Jr.
 Felix Badenhorst
 Sabelo Ndzinisa
 Tony Tsabedze
 Cuthbert Malajila

1 goal

 François Kamano
 Guy-Michel Landel
 Mohamed Yattara
 John Banda
 Costa Nhamoinesu
 Evans Rusike

1 own goal
 Njabulo Ndlovu

Notes

References

External links
Orange Africa Cup Of Nations Qualifiers 2017, CAFonline.com

Group L